The 2014–15 Ligue 1 is the 56th season of top-tier football in Côte d'Ivoire. The season began on 28 November 2014. AS Tanda won their first league title, holding off ASEC Mimosas on the final day of the season. Entering with a one-point lead in the standings, Tanda defeated CO Korhogo 2–1 at home to clinch the title even though ASEC got a 0–1 road win at Sporting Gagnoa to keep the pressure on.

The league comprised 14 teams, the bottom two of which will be relegated to the 2016 Ligue 2. Bouaké and Stella each entered the final day of the season needing a win and to make up a large goal differential to avoid relegation, but both suffered road losses to seal their fate.

Teams
A total of 14 teams will contest the league, including 12 sides from the 2013–14 season and two promoted from the 2013–14 Ligue 2, Bouaké FC and Stade d'Abidjan.
On the other hand, USC Bassam and CO Bouaflé were the last two teams of the 2013–14 season and will play in Ligue 2 for the 2015 season. Séwé Sport are the defending champions from the 2013–14 season.

Stadiums and locations

League table

Results
All teams play in a double round robin system (home and away).

Positions by round

Ligue 1 (Ivory Coast) seasons
Ivory Coast
1